Mikhail Elgin and Alexander Kudryavtsev were the defending champions but chose not to defend their title.

Gao Xin and Sun Fajing won the title after defeating Gong Maoxin and Zhang Ze 7–6(7–5), 4–6, [10–7] in the final.

Seeds

Draw

References
 Main Draw

China International Suzhou - Doubles